In Irish mythology, Fragarach (or Freagarthach), known as "The Whisperer", "The Answerer", or "The Retaliator", was the sword of Nuada, the first high king.  The sword was forged by the gods and was meant to be wielded only by those who posed above the stone of destiny (the Lia Fail) which roared and the sword whispered in response.

So, for the second battle of Mag Tuired, Nuada chose Lugh as provisional king. Using his spear and a sling given to him by Mannanan Mac Lyr, Lugh defeated the Formorians and their king Balor. During the battle, Nuada gave Lugh his sword, as a symbol of the king. Neither the poems nor the Lebor Gabála Érenn say whether Lugh wielded the sword in the battle.

It was said that, with Fragarach at their throat, no one could move or tell a lie, thus the name "Answerer".  The sword was also said to place the wind at the user's command and could cut through any shield or wall, and that it inflicted piercing wounds from which no man could recover.

In popular culture

In The Riders of the Sidhe, author Kenneth C. Flint first reveals the sword being wielded by Manannan Mac Lir who reveals to Lugh Lamfada that he just "borrowed" the sword and it is waiting for its rightful owner.

Science-fantasy author Patricia Kennealy Morrison also uses Fragarach in her series The Keltiad.

Fragarach appears in the Dungeons & Dragons module The Temple of Elemental Evil as a sword that never misses and "answers" any strike to the wielder with a strike of its own.

In the visual novel Fate/hollow ataraxia and manga Fate/kaleid liner Prisma Illya, the sword appears as the weapon of Bazett Fraga McRemitz. It is a weapon that, upon the activation of an opponent's strongest attack, reverses time and kills the enemy before they use their attack.

In the Digimon series, Fragarach is an extensible greatsword carried by Slayerdramon an Ultimate-level Dragon Man Digimon.

In Diane Duane's novel A Wizard Abroad (part of her Young Wizards series), Fragarach is used by Annie Callahan as part of a reenactment of the Second Battle of Magh Tuireadh. Besides its common use as a weapon, Fragarach is used to open a gate to the parallel dimension where the Fomor and the Tuatha De Danann reside.

In the game Mabinogi, Lugh Lavada and Morgant use this weapon as a main weapon. It has three different designs.

In the game Vindictus, the prequel to Mabinogi, the sword was originally owned by Lugh Lamhfada, however it was taken from him after his death.

In the PS3 game Folklore (known by the title Folkssoul in Japan), Answerer is a folk the player encounters and can capture in the fourth nether realm, the Endless Corridor.

The also sword appears in the series The Iron Druid Chronicles. It is wielded by the main character, Atticus O'Sullivan, and is the reason he is hunted by the Irish love god, Aengus Og.

References

External links
 Celtic Objects
 Encyclopaedia of the Celts

Mythological cycle
Ulster Cycle
Cycles of the Kings
Mythological swords
Lugh